The Väinameri (Estonian for Strait Sea or Sea of Straits) or Väinameri Sea is a strait and sub-bay of the Baltic Sea, located between the West Estonian Archipelago and the Estonian mainland, within western Estonia.

It is the northern section of the Gulf of Riga, extending north to the eastern Baltic Sea.

The Väinameri Sea is home to the Väinameri Conservation area.

The Kumari Channel is a shipping lane running north–south in the Väinameri. It is 35km long and has a minimum depth of five metres. The Rukki Channel runs east–west between Hiiumaa and the port of Rohuküla on the mainland.

See also 
 Moonsund Regatta

References

External links 

Gulf of Riga
Straits of the Baltic Sea
Straits of Estonia
Saaremaa